A bridal registry  or wedding registry is a service provided by a website or retail store that assists engaged couples in the communication of gift preferences to wedding guests. Selecting items from store stock, the couple lists desired items and files this list with the chosen merchant.  The list is then made available to wedding guests, either by the couple's family or by the merchant.  Upon the purchase of a listed item, the merchant updates the gift registry accordingly.  In addition to providing valuable information for the buyer, the system helps prevent the receipt of duplicate or unwanted gifts, potentially saving time for both the giver and recipient.

The Chicago-founded department store Marshall Field's first instituted the practice of a bridal registry in 1924 at its Marshall Field and Company Building as a means for the engaged couple to indicate chosen china, silver, and crystal patterns to family and friends.  US-based Target stores pioneered the electronic self-service gift registry in 1993, using a service provided by The Gift Certificate Center of Minneapolis. William J. Veeneman (the founder and CEO of The Gift Certificate Center) and others invented and subsequently patented the technology.

Since the turn of the 21st century, the traditional concept of the bridal registry has evolved.   there are now more specialized versions such as the honeymoon registry, baby registry, house registry, and charity registry.  Additionally, there are registry services that allow registrants to place items from many stores on a single registry (commonly called Universal Registries).

In the UK, bridal registries are more commonly known as Wedding Lists. It is common for couples to send out a copy of their Wedding List details with their wedding invitations.  There has also been a recent trend towards gift-list services that allow the couple to add almost anything to their gift list—such as contributions to their honeymoon, flights, or experience days, as well as traditional gifts from any store.

During the last couple of years, bridal registries have become popular across Europe. Since an increasing number of Europeans study or work abroad at some point in their life, European weddings tend to have international guests. European registry services often account for this by being multi-lingual.

Other kinds of registries

Gift registry

Baby registries 

A baby registry, a service provided by a website or retail store, helps expectant parents to communicate gift preferences to their friends and family. The family lists desired items for their newborn from a store or other service and compile them into a list. The list is then made available to baby shower attendees and other friends and family, either by the couple's family or by the merchant. Upon the purchase of a listed item, the gift registry is updated accordingly. In addition to providing valuable information for the buyer, the system helps prevent the receipt of duplicate or unwanted gifts, potentially saving time for both the giver and expectant family.

Baby registries are a variation of bridal registries and have become an important part of contemporary American baby showers, held by many expectant moms in the United States. Fathers are also beginning to join the tradition.

In addition to merchant-centered registries, there are registry services that allow registrants to place items from many stores on a single registry. Originally, registry lists were held by retailers on location. However, since many retailers have opened that information in their online registries, new parents have been reporting privacy leaks with names, addresses, and birth dates showing as top results on search engines against the will of the wishing couple. A new generation of private online baby registry sites is now offering families the ability to add items from any store and invite their guests privately, or with additional authentication, to prevent unnecessary data exposure.

References

Wedding gifts
Pre-wedding